S. cyaneus may refer to:
 Sassacus cyaneus, a jumping spider species native to Sonora in Mexico and parts of the United States
 Sirex cyaneus, the blue horntail, a wasp species native to Alberta, Canada
 Streptomyces cyaneus, an actinobacterium species

See also